Hex – The Legend of the Towers is a walkthrough dark ride experience at Alton Towers. The ride is based on an interpretation of the local legend of the Chained Oak Tree and is set within the restored ruins of the Towers themselves. It is narrated by the actor Jim Carter.

Description
Hex tells the story of the Chained Oak Tree, a legend based around the towers themselves. The story has been a local legend for hundreds of years.

The legend says that the 15th Earl of Shrewsbury was cursed by an old beggarwoman to suffer a death in the family every time a branch fell from the old oak tree. Hex's version embellishes the end of the 'original' tale with the Earl experimenting on one of the fallen branches in a vault deep within the Towers themselves, and it is this vault, with its entrance bricked up behind a bookcase, that has supposedly been sealed up for two centuries and only recently discovered during renovation work. This is explained in several scenes during the experience.

This attraction was closed for the duration of the 2016 season, but underwent repairs in the winter before reopening in 2017. The ride spent most of the 2022 season closed, due to severe technical issues. It re-opened in September 2022.

Ride experience

Armoury and cinema
The attraction starts in the real armoury of the Towers, decorated with scaffolding and artefacts, which starts to tell the story of the renovation and the discovery of the vault, through video screens found along the twisting atmospheric queue-line. Statues draped in dust sheets decorate plinths high up near the darkened ceiling and sound-effects of chiselling can be heard to give the suggestion that this renovation is currently ongoing and unfinished. At the end of the queue line is a large painting of the Earl hung on the wall, and visitors hear a short narrative which gives a brief introduction to the legend before they are shown onwards into the cinema area (still part of the real building) where visitors watch a short film which dramatises the legend and makes it clear that they will soon be visiting the recently discovered vault where the original branch is located.

Octagon
From the cinema area, guests are let through into the Octagon (still part of the real building) - a large dimly lit eight-sided hall containing more scaffolding and dust-sheets, draped curtains and a whirring generator high on a wall - and are led to believe that the story will be told further through more video screens. However, the generator suddenly 'blows', causing the lights and the video screens to fail and the room is plunged into semi-darkness. A wind picks up, causing the drapes to billow, and the ghostly cursing of the beggarwoman can be heard, along with the loud crash of a falling branch and the sound of horse's hooves. An apparition can be briefly seen in an alcove. To add to the suspense, the noise of the crashing branch is synchronised with a light water spray falling from the ceiling onto the guests below. The generator restarts and the words “a vault sealed for two centuries“ can be heard. The lighting comes back on and a curtain rises to allow guests to move up a small staircase, past the bookcase and into the next section of the attraction.

Vault
At this point, the guests are moving from the original building up into the specially constructed part of the ride, but due to the careful continuation of theming, it is difficult to tell where this occurs. They turn to the left past the bookcase and along a short, low-ceilinged 'stone' corridor - once again similarly decorated to the rest of the attraction - where they wait at two doors for entry into the vault. The scaffolding running along the corridor discourages the guests from getting close enough to touch the walls, as although the previous show areas in the building are real original stone, the walls of this 'stone' section are fibreglass cladding, which sounds hollow when tapped. The vault itself is a large hall-like structure, with the decorative ceiling supported by stone pillars, and shelves containing dusty artefacts lit with flickering candles. It contains the branch itself, chained to a long ledge that runs along the middle of the room, two rows of lap-bar benches that face the branch and a large machine, covered in lights and dials, which the Earl supposedly used in his experiments, which is located up against the far wall and wired to one end of the branch.

The lap-bars are lowered and checked by two staff members, who then leave the vault. The machine starts whirring, the lights flash, smoke starts to pour from the branch, atmospheric music begins and the ride starts. Riders gradually experience an odd sense of movement, even though nothing in the vault appears to be moving - with riders on one side feeling as if they're being pulled away from the branch and on the other feeling as if they're being pushed towards the branch. The benches then begin, almost imperceptibly at first, to swing back and forth relative to the room. The benches feel to be swinging higher and higher in each direction until finally they seem to perform a series of full rotations, with what was the floor rotating fully above the rider’s heads; the riders feel as if they are being repeatedly turned upside down. As the music and the sensation reaches a crescendo, a mass of roots become visible on the 'floor' above – or is it below? –  the disoriented riders' heads. The branch is lit as if to suggest an evil face with illuminated red eyes and the branch twinkles with fibre-optics before gradually the benches and vault return to their starting positions and the ride is over.

Mechanism

The sensory illusion exploits a number of tricks. The longitudinal benches are mounted on a platform that can swing back and forth within the vault. The pivot mechanism for the benches is hidden by the Earl's machine at one end of the room and a large cabinet at the other.  The benches are mounted on the platform angled backward by 20 degrees; riders effectively face slightly upward at rest. During the ride, the platform rotates back and forth by 15 degrees in each direction. This means that at full forward tilt, benches are in fact at 5 degrees forward to horizontal; this minimises the tendency to slip off the bench into the lap restraint. At full backward tilt, the bench is at 45 degrees to the right and up up and away to the roof of heaven to horizontal which accentuates the sensory effect. The vault itself is actually a large, 6-sided drum which can rotate through a full 360 degrees. All of the room scenery is mounted on the inner surface of this drum. At the beginning of the ride, both the benches and the vault are slowly moving back and forth in unison. This is what gives the impression of pushing toward and pulling away from the branch. As the ride progresses, the bench platform continues to swing back and forth by 15 degrees in each direction, while the vault rotation gradually becomes out of unison and increases to give the impression of increasing height and ultimately it turns through a full rotation to give the sensation of inversion. All of this relies on the brain’s over-interpretation of visual inputs in the presence of relatively minor vestibular system inputs; the same principle is used to give the sensation of acceleration and deceleration in full-motion simulators. The lighting also subtly changes from moment to moment to add to the disorientation.

Reception
Initially the response to Hex was mixed, as many guests had mistakenly been expecting a roller coaster inside the Towers, with Oblivion and Nemesis having opened in recent years. However, after some adjustment to the attraction in 2000, response for Hex changed drastically and the ride proved consistently popular. It is now perceived as one of the best dark rides in the UK, praised for its theatrical and respectful use of the Towers ruins.

References

Amusement rides introduced in 2000
Dark rides
Amusement rides manufactured by Vekoma
2000 establishments in the United Kingdom
Alton Towers